Mia Barron is an American actor. She won an Obie for her performance in Hurricane Diane at New York Theatre Workshop. She also  won an Obie and a Drama Desk Award for her work in the Off Broadway production of The Wolves. She Co-Created, along with director Lars Jan, a Theatrical adaptation of Joan Didion's The White Album, which premiered in New York to sold out houses at BAM's Harvey Theatre as part of the Next Wave Festival.She is known for her extensive New York City theater credits, alongside her television and independent film work, most recently Half Empty Half Full, which received a New York Film Award nomination for Best Ensemble.  She is also known as the voice of Molotov Cocktease and Sally Impossible on the Cartoon Network’s long-running comic science-fiction series, The Venture Bros.

Early life
Mia Barron was born in Toronto and raised in Brookline, Massachusetts, the daughter of psychologist James Barron and writer Susan Barron. Her parents divorced and she has two brothers from her father’s second marriage. Barron moved to New York to get her BFA at the Tisch School of the Arts and stayed to get her MFA from the graduate acting program at Tisch.

When she first got out of school, Barron worked extensively in regional theatre appearing in multiple shows at The Long Wharf, The Guthrie, The Old Globe, Huntington Theatre, New York Stage and Film, Berkshire Theatre Festival, Williamstown Theatre Festival, Westport Playhouse, Actors Theatre of Louisville’s Humana festival, and The Acting Company among others. After she settled in New York, Barron became a mainstay in the off-Broadway scene, often working on the premieres of new plays.

Career

Barron's Television credits include a recurring role on Get Shorty (with Chris O'Dowd and Ray Romano), a recurring role on Law and Order:True Crime (Opposite Edie Falco) and the recurring role of Katrina Griffin on NCIS.

Barron was in the off-Broadway production of Sarah Delappe’s The Wolves, named one of the best productions of the year by The New York Times, and by Forbes magazine as "a milestone for women in entertainment." Barron was in the Broadway production of Tom Stoppard’s Tony-winning Coast of Utopia, alongside Billy Crudup and Ethan Hawke. Barron was in the New York premieres of Pulitzer-winning writer Bruce Norris’s The Pain and the Itch at Playwrights Horizons, and Domesticated at Lincoln Center Theater, alongside Jeff Goldblum and Laurie Metcalf. She has also been heavily involved with Chekhov Project at Lake Lucille, having appeared as Elena opposite Bill Irwin’s Vanya, and Natasha opposite Michael Chernus’s Andrey.

Barron moved to Los Angeles, where she has become a regular on television and in the independent film world, as well as continuing her work in the New York theatre world.

Personal life
Barron has one child, Esme, with her partner multi-media artist Lars Jan.

Stage credits
Barron's stage credits include:

The World Over at Playwrights Horizons (2002)

She Stoops to Comedy at Playwrights Horizons (2003)

Big Times as co-writer and performer, at Soho Rep (2005)

The Pain and the Itch at Playwrights Horizons (2006)

The Coast of Utopia at Lincoln Center (2006-2007)

What Once We Felt at Lincoln Center (2009)

Spirit Control at Manhattan Theatre Club (2010)

Knickerbocker at The Public Theatre (2011)

Domesticated at Lincoln Center (2013)

Dying For It at Atlantic Theater Company (2015)

"The Wolves"  at Lincoln Center (2017)

"Hurricane Diane" at New York Theatre Workshop (2019)

Film/TV credits
Barron's film and television credits include:

The Venture Bros. as Molotov Cocktease and Sally Impossible (2004-2015)

Righteous Kill as Jill Goldman (2008)

27 Dresses (2008)

"Grey's Anatomy" as Lauren Turner (2010)

"Elementary" as Lara Banin (2013)

Amnesiac as Officer Rogers (2014)

"Blue Bloods" as Janet Walters (2014)

The Impossibilities as Marlene (2015)

I Smile Back as Susan (2015)

"Modern Family"  as Vicky (2016)

"Bones"  as Gail Bradford (2016)

NCIS as Doctor Katrina Griffin (2016)

Law and Order:True Crime as Marcia (2017)

Get Shorty as Emily (2018)

References

 
 
 
 Lincoln Center Theater
 Brooklyn Rail
 Variety
 Broadway World
 New York Theatre Guide
 New York Times
 Observer
 New Yorker

External links 
 
 

Year of birth missing (living people)
Living people
Tisch School of the Arts alumni
American stage actresses
American television actresses
21st-century American actresses